The Vale of Glamorgan Festival is a contemporary music festival based in and around the county of Vale of Glamorgan, Wales and held annually during May (formerly September). The festival was founded in 1969 by Welsh composer John Metcalf, who is the Artistic Director to this day.

After initially being a generic classical music festival, the Vale of Glamorgan Festival changed its focus in 1992 to feature exclusively living composers. In recognition of this position, the Vale of Glamorgan Festival received the Prudential Award in 1994. The Festival's Artistic Director received one of four inaugural Creative Wales Ambassador Awards from the Arts Council of Wales in 2009.

Highlights include festivals devoted to the music of the Baltic States (1996), Austria (1998) and Australia (2001). The 2002 festival featured a tour to Britain by the Finnish Radio Chamber Choir. 2005 brought a mix of music, visual art, storytelling and food, in a festival with interwoven themes of Japan and the work of women composers.

The 2013 event, held at the St Donats Arts Centre and Cardiff's Hoddinott Hall, was favourably reviewed by The Guardian, highlighting composer Sebastian Currier as the outstanding performance.

Composers John Tavener and Tarik O'Regan formed the focus of the 2014 Festival. BBC NOW broadcasts an annual concert featuring the top five composers from the festival.

References

External links
 The Vale of Glamorgan Festival

Music festivals in Wales
Festivals established in 1969
Annual events in Wales
Contemporary classical music festivals
1969 establishments in Wales